Medhufinolhu as a place name may refer to:
 Medhufinolhu (Alif Dhaal Atoll) (Republic of Maldives)
 Medhufinolhu (Baa Atol) (Republic of Maldives)
 Medhufinolhu (Kaafu Atol) (Republic of Maldives)
 Medhufinolhu (Laamu Atol) (Republic of Maldives)
 Medhufinolhu (Meemu Atoll) (Republic of Maldives)